Latin Percussion, also known as LP, is a brand of percussion instruments, specializing in ethnic instruments and Latin percussion.

History
LP was founded in New York City in 1964 by Martin Cohen. As the company expanded, they added imported lines to their catalog, and also became an exporter.

LP invented several instruments that have become commonplace such as the vibraslap, the jam block, and granite blocks.

Company information
In 2002, LP was purchased by Kaman Music Corporation and operated as its independent subsidiary within Kaman's music distribution segment.

In 2008, LP was purchased by Fender Musical Instruments Corporation.

In 2014, LP was purchased by Drum Workshop.

Awards
In 2001 Martin Cohen received a Special Recognition Award from the International Latin Music Hall of Fame for his contributions during nearly 40 years in the music industry.

References

External links
 LP home page
Martin Cohen Interview NAMM Oral History Library (2006)

Percussion instrument manufacturing companies
Musical instrument manufacturing companies of the United States
Manufacturing companies based in New Jersey